The 1939 Liège–Bastogne–Liège was the 29th edition of the Liège–Bastogne–Liège cycle race and was held on 14 May 1939. The race started and finished in Liège. The race was won by Albert Ritserveldt.

General classification

References

1939
1939 in Belgian sport